Life of Python is the name of two documentaries, both intended to mark 20 years of the Monty Python team in 1989, but broadcast the following year after the death of team member Graham Chapman on 4 October - the eve of the 20th anniversary.

Synopsis 
The documentaries take in many aspects of Python history. The pre-Flying Circus shows are covered, including The Frost Report, At Last The 1948 Show, Do Not Adjust Your Set and The Complete and Utter History of Britain. Other topics include the naming of the show, the dynamics of the writing sessions, the animations, attitudes to women, censorship and the team's surprise at their success in America.

Cast
John Cleese
Terry Gilliam
Eric Idle
Terry Jones
Michael Palin 
Dan Aykroyd
Dudley Moore (US version only)
Steve Martin
Chevy Chase (US version only)
Barry Took
Carol Cleveland
Jane Curtin (US version only)
John Lloyd (UK version only)
Ben Elton (UK version only)
Stephen Fry (UK version only)

Background and production
Life of Python was produced by Tiger Television in collaboration with Devillier-Donegan Enterprises.

US Version

Mike Fox, Graham Smith, Carl Teitelbaum - Cameras
Fraser Barber, Michael Lax - Sound
Marnie Jung - Production Assistant
Sue Vertue - Production Manager
Ron Blythe - Editor
Charles Brand - Executive Producer
Michelle De Larrabeiti - Co-producer
Mark Redhead - Producer/Director

UK Version

Roger Chapman, Lawrence Gardner, Max Harrison, Phil Milliard, Carl Teitelbaum - Camera Assistants
Marnie Jung - Production Assistant
Sue Vertue - Production Manager
Jason Hunt, Terry Hunt, Jim McBride - Electricians
Fraser Barber, Michael Lax, David Welch - Sound
Colin Martin - Dubbing Mixer
Bill Ogden - VT Editor
Mike Fox, Graham Smith, Paul Sommers - Cameramen
Roya Salari - Assistant Editor
Richard Monks - Dubbing Editor
Martyn Hone - Film Editor
Michelle De Larrabeiti - Associate Producer
Charles Brand - Executive Producer
Mark Redhead - Director
Mark Chapman - Producer/Director

Differences between versions 
There are many differences between the two documentaries. The US version opens with footage of the Pythons (minus Chapman) meeting up at Twickenham Studios in September 1989 dressed in school uniform, in preparation for the filming of a new sketch for Parrot Sketch Not Included, which was ultimately cut from broadcast. The UK version omits this and instead opens with footage of Graham Chapman's memorial service in December 1989, including John Cleese's memorably irreverent eulogy, and closes the documentary with Eric Idle leading the congregation with a singalong of "Always Look on the Bright Side of Life".  The UK version is introduced and narrated by comedy producer John Lloyd, who had recently compiled the sketches for the Parrot Sketch Not Included special. The interviews with the five contributing Pythons are mostly different in both versions, with only the occasional overlap. Much of the differing content and choice of interviewees in the two versions is geared toward their respective US and UK audiences.

Release

Broadcast
The US version was broadcast on the Showtime network on 16 March 1990, with the UK version airing on the team's 21st anniversary on 5 October 1990, as part of the BBC's Omnibus documentary series.

Home media
The US version of the documentary was released on VHS in the UK by Palace Video in 1991.

References

1990 documentary films
1990 television films
1990 films
British documentary films
Monty Python films
1990s English-language films
1990s British films